Atashgah or Ateshgah may refer to:

Fire temple, a Zoroastrian worship place
Atashgah, Alborz, a village in Iran
Atashgah, Ardabil, a village in Iran
Atashgah-e Jadid, a village in  Ardabil Province, Iran
Atashgah, Chaharmahal and Bakhtiari, a village in Iran
Ateshgah, Gilan, a village in Iran
Ateshgah-e Bozorg, a village in Kohgiluyeh and Boyer-Ahmad Province, Iran
Atashgah of Isfahan, a tower-like construction located in Iran
Ateshgah of Baku, also known as Fire Temple of Baku, is a museum now in Baku Azerbaijan
Atashgah of Tbilisi, also known as Fire Temple of Tbilisi, is a museum now in Tbilisi Georgia
Atashgah Castle, a castle in the city of Kashmar
Atashgah Manmade-Cave, a Cave in the city of Kashmar